Jarmani Patrick Langlais is a professional association footballer, currently playing as a striker for Slimbridge on loan from Bristol Rovers.

Career
He made his first appearance in senior football in 2021 in a pre-season friendly against Plymouth Argyle, aged just sixteen.

His competitive debut came as a substitute in a EFL Cup first round tie against Cheltenham Town on 10 August 2021.

On 3 December 2022, Langlais joined Southern League Division One club Frome Town on loan.

Career Statistics

References

 

2000s births
Year of birth uncertain
Living people
English footballers
Association football forwards
Cardiff City F.C. players
Bristol Rovers F.C. players
Frome Town F.C. players
Slimbridge A.F.C. players
Southern Football League players